The Office for the Liturgical Celebrations of the Supreme Pontiff is that section of the Roman Curia responsible for organizing and conducting liturgies and other religious ceremonies performed by the pope of the Catholic Church. It is headed by a "master" appointed for a term of five years.

The office and the consultants who advise it support the pope in expressing his interpretation of the liturgical modifications instituted following the Second Vatican Council. Popes have at times supported postconciliar reforms, restored earlier practices, and introduced further innovations. When Pope Francis named five new consultants in September 2013, he included none of those appointed by Pope Benedict XVI, who were known to promote a return to preconciliar liturgical practices. Benedict restored preconciliar elements to the rite for the canonization of saints and Francis removed them and further shortened the ceremony. Guido Marini, the Master when Francis instituted his changes, is known as a traditionalist, but performs to the pope's instructions. In the words of one journalist, his job is "to thread papal preferences into the pageantry". For example, he works to ensure that liturgical music is integrated into the liturgy as Francis prefers, so that participants are never forced to wait for music to conclude before proceeding. On 19 January 2019, Pope Francis transferred responsibility for the Sistine Chapel Choir from the Papal household to this Office.

Masters of Pontifical Liturgical Celebrations
 Enrico Dante (1947 – 1967) 
 Annibale Bugnini (1968 – 9 January 1970) 
 Virgilio Noè (9 January 1970 – 30 January 1982)
 John Magee (6 March 1982 – 11 February 1987)
 Piero Marini (23 February 1987 – 1 October 2007)
 Guido Marini (1 October 2007 – 29 August 2021)
 Diego Giovanni Ravelli (11 October 2021 – present)

In addition to assisting the pope at sacred functions, the Papal Master of Ceremonies assists cardinals on various occasions: during consistories, when a cardinal takes possession of his titular church, and during solemn celebrations of Mass or other important religious services. When a cardinal is created at a consistory, the Master of Papal Liturgical Celebrations assigns one of the Office's Masters of Ceremonies to him.

The Master is assisted by several Masters of Ceremonies. They at times hold other offices in the Roman Curia. With the most recent appointment on 14 June 2020, there are eight Masters of Ceremonies.

See also
 Papal Mass

References

Bibliography 
 Günther Wassilowsky, Hubert Wolf: Päpstliches Zeremoniell in der Frühen Neuzeit – Das Diarium des Zeremonienmeisters Paolo Alaleone de Branca während des Pontifikats Gregors XV. (1621–1623). Rhema-Verlag, Münster 2007,  (with the complete original Latin text of the diarium)

1947 establishments in Europe
Catholic liturgy
Departments of the Roman Curia